William Grey, 1st Baron Grey of Werke (died 1674) was an English politician who sat in the House of Commons from 1621 to 1622. He supported the Parliamentary cause in the English Civil War.

Early life
Grey was the son of Sir Ralph Grey, of Chillingham, Northumberland and his wife Jane, daughter of WilIiam Ardlington, of Ardlington,  Berkshire. He was created baronet on 15 June 1619. In 1621, he was elected Member of Parliament for Northumberland. He succeeded to the estates of Chillingham and Werke on the death of his father and was created Baron Grey of Werke on 11 February 1624.

Career
Grey was commander of parliamentarian forces in the east in 1642. He was imprisoned for refusing to go as commissioner to Scotland in 1643. He was speaker of House of Lords in 1643 and was one of the Lay Assessors at the Westminster Assembly from 1643 to 1649. In 1648 he was appointed a commissioner of great seal but refused the engagement in 1649. He was pardoned at Restoration.

Personal life
Grey married Cecilia Wentworth, eldest daughter of Sir John Wentworth, 1st Baronet, of Gosfield. He was succeeded by his eldest son, Ralph Grey, 2nd Baron Grey of Werke. His daughter Katherine married Sir Edward Mosley, 2nd Baronet.

References

Year of birth missing
1674 deaths
English MPs 1621–1622
Roundheads
1
Lay members of the Westminster Assembly
Chancellors of the Duchy of Lancaster